Sinorhodeus microlepis (Chinese:细鳞华鳑鲏) is a bitterling native to the Yangtze river in Chongqing City, China, and it is the only member of the genus Sinorhodeus. This species breeds in the Asian clam (Corbicula fluminea), which is different from all other bitterling-like cyprinids.

Distribution
The Sinorhodeus microlepis  has a very narrow distribution range, and it is possibly endangered now.

Description
This fish has a very large mouth and can prey on shrimps or tiny fish. Unlike other Acheilognathinae，the Sinorhodeus microlepis has tiny scales on their body. Male in nuptial color are red, while at other times are wax yellow. The female's body colour is silver.

This species can be found in China aquarium trade, where it is called as the 'volcano bitterling'(火山鳑鲏) or 'Southwestern bitterling'（西南鳑鲏）

References

Acheilognathinae
Monotypic fish genera